Vazir Surkhay oglu Orujov is the National Hero of Azerbaijan and the participant of the First Nagorno-Karabakh War.

Early life and education 

Vazir Orujov was born on December 26, 1956, in Xoruzlu village, Tartar region. He was an Azerbaijani Kurd. He received his secondary education in Xoruzlu village High School, was admitted to Baku Light Industry Technical School in 1974. He was drafted to the military service in 1975, demobilized from army in 1977 and continued his uncompleted secondary specialized education. In 1984 Orujov moved to Belkovo city of Arkhangelsk Oblast, Russia.

Karabakh war and participation in battles 
In 1992, he being aware of Khojaly massacre, coming back to Azerbaijan joined to Tartar self-defense battalion on May 4. Though Orujov started to fight as a private soldier, he within a very short period of time, promoted up to the position of Deputy Battalion Commander for his command skills. He left his home saying that he leaves for Tartar city. By taking a gun of wounded police officer he met in his way towards to Shikharkh, joined to the battle for Aghdara informing no one in this concern. 

On August 1992 Orujov was on a reconnaissance mission in Sarsang Reservoir. He was accompanied with 30 scouts armed with PK machine guns. The group of Sardar Hamidov attacked from front, and the group of scouts of Orujov attacked from the back. Arabo battalion suffered a great loss in that day.

On September 1, 1992, in a battle for Childiran village while intending to shoot the tank of enemy, he was hardly wounded. On March 22, 1993, in hard battles for Globus height of Aghdara he died.

Honors  
Orujov was buried in Martyrs' Lane in Baku city. Pursuant to the decree No.495 of the President of the Republic of Azerbaijan dated March 27, 1993 he was awarded the name of National Hero of Azerbaijan after his death.

See also 
 First Nagorno-Karabakh War
 National Hero of Azerbaijan

References

External links
 Battle of Tartar and Vazir Orujov. – Documental film.

1956 births
1993 deaths
People from Tartar District
Azerbaijani military personnel of the Nagorno-Karabakh War
Azerbaijani military personnel killed in action
National Heroes of Azerbaijan